The Thornton-Donovan School (TD) was founded as the New Rochelle School and Kindergarten in New Rochelle, New York. It was founded by Judge Martin Jerome Keogh in 1901.  The first teacher and headmistress was Emily Scott Thornton, a Philadelphia native educated at University College Nottingham, now the University of Nottingham. The headmaster as of 2018 is Douglas E. Fleming, Jr.

The school is now at its third campus, on Overlook Circle in the Beechmont neighborhood of New Rochelle. It inhabits three former homes, including the former Andrew Crawford estate, now the Main Building.

Overview
The Thornton-Donovan School is now a New York State accredited high school educating over 175 students in grades K-12 every year. On May 25, 2005, students planted two flowering trees at the end of Overlook Circle and at Lester Place and Beechmont Lake as a gift to the city of New Rochelle, New York.

The school has a swimming pool, an outdoor playset, woodchips, a driveway, more than thirty living trees, a large grassy field, a basketball/tennis/family court, three buildings, a parking lot/Hacky Sack arena, and a shed for arts and crafts which is used only during the summer.

2008-2009 Renovation
During the early 2008, plans were being made to expand and level the field along with building a new basketball court. A proposal for the renovation was sent to the New Rochelle Department of Development Planning Board on June 24. The proposal stated that the field would be graded, ten irrigation sprinklers would be installed, the basketball court would be taken apart and relocated to allow more field space, a ten-foot chain link fence would enclose the new court, and twenty trees were to be removed during the process. Headmaster Douglas Fleming has referred to the final product as the Field of Dreams.

Summer Challenge Program
In the summer, the school also holds a summer camp program, in its 46th consecutive year as of summer 2014. Children aged 3–14 are permitted to join the program. The children are split into two divisions: Play School (3–7 years) and Sports Fitness (7–14 years). They participate in a wide variety of sports. Activities include: tennis, softball, field hockey, swimming, arts and crafts, karate, dance, basketball, soccer, trampolining, capture the flag, an outdoor playset, watermelon, and kickball. The older group is also taken to a bowling alley in the Bronx every Friday, where the children have a chance to bowl.

Thematic Language Education
Middle and Upper School curricula are themed annually on an area of the world. Students are exposed daily to a dynamic course of learning throughout the year learning not only about international cultures, but actual politics, history and the arts of painting in an intramural and experiential context. The school also has strong ties to several countries, with 35 sister schools throughout Europe, Asia, and Latin America. During the school year, about four students are selected to go to one of several sister schools. The more notable exchange trips are to Busan, South Korea; Buenos Aires, Argentina; Dublin, Ireland; La Rochelle, France; Nottingham, England; Rome, Italy; Mexico City, and Guatemala City.

A rigorous course of learning is punctuated by a "spring-time fling" trip to locations associated with the year's theme (i.e. - the country or locale the school studied). Students, faculty and friends can all join for an exceptional educational excursion. Since 1994, there have been 18 trips, of which 14 were international.

1990s
Little information about the first six trips taken by the school has been given through their website; however, trips to six countries and one state were undertaken between 1994 and 1999.

2000- Greece
The new millennium began with an 11-day trip to Greece that started on May 18 and ended on May 28. The travelers departed from John F. Kennedy Airport in New York City on May 18 and landed in Athens, Greece on May 19. The group spent the morning and early afternoon at the Hotel Plaka in old Athens, overlooking the Acropolis. After touring the old city that evening, the school went to the Acropolis at night before going to Pnyx Hill to see a light show. On May 20, a full day of sightseeing took place. Travelers visited the Propylaea, Temple of Athena, the Erechtheum, the Parthenon, the Acropolis Museum, and the Theatre of Dionysus. At 6:00 pm, they attended a Changing of the Guard ceremony in front of the Tomb of the Unknown Soldier.

2001- Spain
In 2001, the school took an 18-day excursion to Spain from May 10 to 28.

2002- New York
The following year was a ten-day tour of New York City, Upstate New York, and Montreal from April 12 to 21.

2003- Florida
In 2003, the school traveled to southern Florida from April 25 to May 4.

2004- Belgium
In 2004, a ten-day trip to Belgium began on April 29 and ended on May 8.

2005- Illinois and Missouri
In 2005, the schools' most recent non-international trip took place from April 1 to 10 in Illinois and Missouri.

2006- England
During 2006, the school traveled to England for two weeks from April 28 to May 13.

2007- Japan

From May 4 to 17, 2007, the school journeyed to Japan. One of the largest excursions made by the school, a total of 90 people, including teachers and parents, took part in the trip across the Pacific. Due to the large number of people, two flights were taken to Japan, one in the morning and one in the afternoon, both of which were from John F. Kennedy Airport to Narita Airport; however, the first stopped in Los Angeles, California to reduce the amount of waiting time between the two flights. That night was spent in the Shiba Park Hotel in Tokyo. The first destination was the Ghibli Museum in Mitaka, Tokyo before traveling to the Meiji Shrine which dates back to 1920. After visiting the shine, the group traveled across the Rainbow bridge to the Fuji Television building. The final visit of the day was to the Tokyo International Forum where the group attended a performance by La Folle Journee au Japan. The next day the school traveled to the Imperial Palace for an exclusive tour inside the building; however, this did not take place due to misunderstandings by the students and the group toured the outside of the palace. After touring the Imperial Palace, the next stop was the John Lennon Museum in Chūō-ku, Saitama.

2008- Portugal

The 2008 trip taken by the school was from April 25 to May 10 in Portugal.

2009- Brazil
From April 29, 2009, the school toured Salvador, Brazil. The trip has taken students through the favelas of Rio de Janeiro and entered the Amazon Rainforest on May 1.

2010- South Africa
As of September 28, 2008, the 2009-10 semester trip is set to be about South Africa.

The arts and community connections
 The mural "The Constellations" on the first floor of T-D's main building was painted by a relative of James Joyce, Alton S. Tobey
 Lumen Martin Winter's Haus was T-D's second acquisition for the current opus. The mosaic is in the United Nations' headquarters at Manhattan. There is also a mural by him entitled "Aspirational Music" in the school's main building structure.
 The school has many connections to Lion's Club International, a worldwide "service" organization.

Notable alumni
Wayne Allyn Root – the 2008 United States Libertarian Party vice-presidential nominee. He attended the school from 1977 to 1979 when he graduated.
 Joey Kramer - The drummer from Aerosmith.

Headmasters
1. Emily Scott Thornton- 1901-1945
2. Genevieve F. Berns- 1945-1968
3. Douglas E. Fleming, Jr.- 1968–present

References

External links
 Thornton-Donovan School website
 TD Private School School Report
 Video about the Thornton-Donovan School

Educational institutions established in 1901
Education in New Rochelle, New York
Private K-12 schools in Westchester County, New York
1901 establishments in New York (state)